Latin American literature consists of the oral and written literature of Latin America in several languages, particularly in Spanish, Portuguese, and the indigenous languages of the Americas. It rose to particular prominence globally during the second half of the 20th century, largely due to the international success of the style known as magical realism.  As such, the region's literature is often associated solely with this style, with the 20th century literary movement known as Latin American Boom, and with its most famous exponent, Gabriel García Márquez. Latin American literature has a rich and complex tradition of literary production that dates back many centuries.

History

Pre-Columbian literature 

Pre-Columbian cultures were primarily oral, though the Aztecs and Mayans, for instance, produced elaborate codices.  Oral accounts of mythological and religious beliefs were also sometimes recorded after the arrival of European colonizers, as was the case with the Popol Vuh.  Moreover, a tradition of oral narrative survives to this day, for instance among the Quechua-speaking population of Peru and the Quiché of Peru.

Colonial literature 
From the very moment when Europeans encountered the New World, early explorers and conquistadores produced written accounts and crónicas of their experience, such as Columbus's letters or Bernal Díaz del Castillo's description of the conquest of the Aztec Empire.  At times, colonial practices stirred a lively debate about the ethics of colonization and the status of the indigenous peoples, as reflected for instance in Bartolomé de las Casas's Brief Account of the Destruction of the Indies. The first printing press in North America was established in present-day Mexico City in 1539 by publisher Juan Cromberger.

Mestizos and natives also contributed to the body of colonial literature. Authors such as El Inca Garcilaso de la Vega and Guaman Poma wrote accounts of the Spanish conquest that show a perspective that often contrasts with the colonizers' accounts.

During the colonial period, written culture was often in the hands of the church, the context within which Sor Juana Inés de la Cruz wrote memorable poetry and philosophical essays. Her interest in scientific thought and experiment led to professional discussions and writings with Isaac Newton. Toward the end of the 18th Century and the beginning of the 19th, a distinctive criollo literary tradition emerged, including the first novels such as José Joaquín Fernández de Lizardi's El Periquillo Sarniento (1816).  The "libertadores" themselves were also often distinguished writers, such as Simón Bolívar and Andrés Bello.

The 19th Century of Latin American Literature 
The 19th century was a period of "foundational fictions" (in critic Doris Sommer's words), novels in the Romantic or Naturalist traditions that attempted to establish a sense of national identity, and which often focused on the role and rights of the indigenous or the dichotomy of "civilization or barbarism", pioneered in Latin America by Esteban Echeverría who was influenced by the Parisian romantics while he lived there from 1825 to 1930. Romanticism was then taken up by other prominent literary figures, for which see, the Argentine Domingo Sarmiento's Facundo (1845). Likewise, Alberto Blest Gana's Martin Rivas (1862), widely acknowledged as the first Chilean novel, was at once a passionate love story and a national epic about revolution.  Other foundation fictions include the Colombian Jorge Isaacs's María (1867), Ecuadorian Juan León Mera's Cumandá (1879), or the Brazilian Euclides da Cunha's Os Sertões (1902).  Such works are still the bedrocks of national canons, and usually mandatory elements of high school curricula.

Other important works of 19th century Latin American literature include regional classics, such as José Hernández's epic poem Martín Fierro (1872). The story of a poor gaucho drafted to fight a frontier war against Indians, Martín Fierro is an example of the "gauchesque", an Argentine genre of poetry centered around the lives of gauchos.

The literary movements of the nineteenth century in Latin America range from Neoclassicism at the beginning of the century to Romanticism in the middle of the century, to Realism and Naturalism in the final third of the century, and finally to the invention of Modernismo, a distinctly Latin American literary movement, at the end of the nineteenth century. The next sections discuss prominent trends in these movements more thoroughly.

Romanticism, Realism, Naturalism, and Emerging Literary Trends 
The Latin American wars of Independence that occurred in the early nineteenth century in Latin America led to literary themes of identity, resistance, and human rights. Writers often followed and innovated popular literary movements (such as Romanticism, Realism, and Naturalism), but many were also exploring ideas such as nationalism and independence. Cultural independence spread across Latin America during this time, and writers depicted Latin American themes and locations in their works. While literature that questioned the colonial order may have emerged initially during the seventeenth century in Latin America, it rose in popularity in the form of resistance against Spain, the United States, and other imperialist nations in the nineteenth century. Latin American writers sought a Latin American identity, and this would later be closely tied with the Modernismo literary movement.

Male authors mainly dominated colonial literature, with the exception of literary greats such as Sor Juana Inés de la Cruz, but a shift began in the nineteenth century that allowed for more female authors to emerge. An increase in women's education and writing brought some women writers to the forefront, including the Cuban Romantic author Gertrudis Gómez de Avellaneda with the novel Sab (1841), a romantic novel offering subtle critique of slavery and the treatment of women in Cuba, the Peruvian Naturalist author Clorinda Matto de Turner who wrote what is considered one of the most important novels of "indigenismo" in the 19th century: Aves sin nido (1889), and the Argentinian Romantic writer Juana Manuela Gorriti (1818-1892), who penned a variety of novels and short stories, such as La hija del mashorquero (1860) and directed a literary circle in Peru. A Naturalist trail-blazer, Peruvian Mercedes Cabello de Carbonera penned Blanca Sol (1888) to critique women's lack of practical work options in her society. Women writers of the nineteenth century often wrote about the inequalities in Latin America that were vestiges of colonialism such as the marginalization and oppression of Indigenous peoples, slaves, and women. Many works by women in this period challenged Latin American patriarchal societies. These prominent women writers discussed the hypocrisy of the dominant class and institutions that existed in their nascent nations and criticized the corruption of the government. Some prime examples of such works include Clorinda Matto de Turner's Indole, Herencia, and El Conspirador: autobiografia de un hombre publico.

Modernismo, the Vanguards, and Boom precursors
In the late 19th century, modernismo emerged, a poetic movement whose founding text was the Nicaraguan Rubén Darío's Azul (1888).  This was the first Latin American poetry movement to influence literary culture outside of the region, and was also the first truly Latin American literature, in that national differences were no longer as much of an issue and authors sought to establish Latin American connections.  José Martí, for instance, though a Cuban patriot, also lived in Mexico and the United States and wrote for journals in Argentina and elsewhere.  In 1900 the Uruguayan José Enrique Rodó wrote what became read as a manifesto for the region's cultural awakening, Ariel. Delmira Agustini, one of the female figures of modernismo, wrote poetry that both utilized typical modernist images (such as swans) and adapted them with feminist messages and erotic themes, as critic Sylvia Molloy describes.

Though modernismo itself is often seen as aestheticist and anti-political, some poets and essayists, Martí among them but also the Peruvians Manuel González Prada and José Carlos Mariátegui, introduced compelling critiques of the contemporary social order and particularly the plight of Latin America's indigenous peoples. In this way, the early twentieth century also saw the rise of indigenismo, a trend previously popularized by Clorinda Matto de Turner, that was dedicated to representing indigenous culture and the injustices that such communities were undergoing, as for instance with the Peruvian José María Arguedas and the Mexican Rosario Castellanos.

Resistance against colonialism, a trend that emerged earlier in the nineteenth century, was also extremely important in modernismo. This resistance literature was promoted by prominent modernists including the aforementioned José Martí (1853-1895) and Rubén Darío (1867-1916). Martí warned readers about the imperialistic tendencies of the United States and described how Latin America should avoid allowing the United States to intervene in their affairs. A prime example of this sort of message is found in Martí's Our America, published in 1892. Darío also worked to highlight the threat of American imperialism, which can be seen in his poem To Roosevelt, as well as his other works Cake-Walk: El Baile de Moda. Many of his works were published in La Revista Moderna de Mexico, a modernist magazine of the time.

The Argentine Jorge Luis Borges invented what was almost a new genre, the philosophical short story, and would go on to become one of the most influential of all Latin American writers.  At the same time, Roberto Arlt offered a very different style, closer to mass culture and popular literature, reflecting the urbanization and European immigration that was shaping the Southern Cone. Both writers were the most important emergents in an important controversy in Argentinian literature between the so-called  Florida Group of Borges and other writers and artists that used to meet at the Richmond Cafe in the centrical Florida street of Buenos Aires city vs. the  Boedo Group of Roberto Arlt that used to meet at the  Japanese Cafe in the most periferical Boedo borough of the same city.

The Venezuelan Romulo Gallegos wrote in 1929 what came to be one of the most well known Latin American novels in the twentieth century, Doña Barbara.  Doña Barbara is a realist novel describing the conflict between civilization and barbarism in the plainlands of South America, and is a masterpiece of criollismo. The novel became an immediate hit, being translated into over forty languages.

Notable figures in Brazil at this time include the exceptional novelist and short story writer Machado de Assis, whose both ironic view and deep psychological analysis introduced a universal scope in Brazilian prose, the modernist poets Mário de Andrade, Oswald de Andrade (whose "Manifesto Antropófago" praised Brazilian powers of transculturation), and Carlos Drummond de Andrade.

In the 1920s Mexico, the Stridentism and los Contemporáneos represented the influx of avant-garde movements, while the Mexican Revolution inspired novels such as Mariano Azuela's Los de abajo, a committed work of social realism and the revolution and its aftermath would continue to be a point of reference for Mexican literature for many decades.  In the 1940s, the Cuban novelist and musicologist Alejo Carpentier coined the term "lo real maravilloso" and, along with the Mexican Juan Rulfo and the Guatemalan Miguel Ángel Asturias, would prove a precursor of the Boom and its signature style of "magic realism".

Poetry after Modernismo

There is a vibrant tradition of prose poetry in 20th century Latin America; the prose poem becomes a prevalent format for lyrical philosophical inquiry and sensual sentiments of the region's poets. Masters of the prose poem include Jorge Luis Borges ("Everything and Nothing"), Pablo Neruda (Passions and Impressions), Octavio Paz (Aguila o Sol?/Eagle or Sun?), Alejandra Pizarnik ("Sex/Night"), Giannina Braschi (Empire of Dreams) and Rafael Cadenas (Memorial).

Leaders of the vanguard whose poetry express love, romance, and a commitment to left leaning regional politics are Cesar Vallejo (Peru) and Nobel laureate Pablo Neruda (Chile). Following their lead are Ernesto Cardenal (Nicaragua), Roque Dalton (El Salvador), Nicolás Guillén (Cuba), Gonzalo Rojas (Chile) and Mario Benedetti (Uruguay), and Peruvians Blanca Varela, Jorge Eduardo Eielson or Javier Sologuren.

After Modernismo several lesser known, short-lived poetry movements emerged in Latin America. In Chile, Braulio Arenas and others founded in 1938 the Mandrágora group, strongly influenced by Surrealism as well as by Vicente Huidobro's Creacionismo. In Peru, Cesar Moro and Emilio Adolfo Westphalen developed Surrealism in the Andes region.

The Boom

 
After World War II, Latin America enjoyed increasing economic prosperity, and a new-found confidence also gave rise to a literary boom. From 1960 to 1967, some of the major seminal works of the boom were published and before long became widely noticed, admired, and commented on beyond Latin America itself. Many of these novels and collections of short stories were somewhat rebellious from the general point of view of Latin America culture. Authors crossed traditional boundaries, experimented with language, and often mixed different styles of writing in their works.

Structures of literary works were also changing. Boom writers ventured outside traditional narrative structures, embracing non-linearity and experimental narration.  The figure of Jorge Luis Borges, though not a Boom author per se, was extremely influential for the Boom generation.  Latin American authors were inspired by North American and European authors such as William Faulkner, James Joyce, and Virginia Woolf, by the legendary Spanish poet and dramatist Federico García Lorca as well as by each other's works; many of the authors knew one another, which led to a mutual crossbreeding of styles.

The Boom launched Latin American literature onto the world stage. It was distinguished by daring and experimental novels such as Julio Cortázar's Rayuela (1963), that were frequently published in Spanish and quickly translated into English.  From 1966 to 1968, Emir Rodríguez Monegal published his influential Latin American literature monthly Mundo Nuevo, with excerpts of unreleased novels from then-new writers such as Guillermo Cabrera Infante or Severo Sarduy, including two chapters of Gabriel García Márquez's Cien años de soledad in 1966. In 1967, the published book was one of the Boom's defining novels, which led to the association of Latin American literature with magic realism, though other important writers of the period such as Mario Vargas Llosa and Carlos Fuentes do not fit so easily within this framework. In the same year, 1967. Miguel Ángel Asturias was awarded the Nobel prize for literature, making his magical realist, metaphor-heavy, folkloristic and sometimes politically charged novels widely known in Europe and North America. Perhaps, the Boom's culmination arrived in Augusto Roa Bastos's monumental Yo, el supremo (1974).  Other important novelists of the period include the Chilean José Donoso, the Guatemalan Augusto Monterroso and the Cuban Guillermo Cabrera Infante.

Though the literary boom occurred while Latin America was having commercial success, the works of this period tended to move away from the positives of the modernization that was underway. Boom works often tended not to focus on social and local issues, but rather on universal and at times metaphysical themes.

Political turmoil in Latin American countries such as Cuba at this time influenced the literary boom as well. Some works anticipated an end to the prosperity that was occurring, and even predicted old problems would resurface in the near future.  Their works foreshadowed the events to come in the future of Latin America, with the 1970s and 1980s dictatorships, economic turmoil, and Dirty Wars.

Post-Boom and McOndo   

Post-Boom literature is sometimes characterized by a tendency towards irony and humor, as the narrative of Alfredo Bryce Echenique, and towards the use of popular genres, as in the work of Manuel Puig.  Some writers felt the success of the Boom to be a burden, and spiritedly denounced the caricature that reduces Latin American literature to magical realism. Hence the Chilean Alberto Fuguet coined McOndo as an antidote to the Macondo-ism that demanded of aspiring writers that they set their tales in steamy tropical jungles in which the fantastic and the real happily coexisted. In a mock diary by post-modernist Giannina Braschi the Narrator of the Latin American Boom is shot by a Macy's make-up artist who accuses the Boom of capitalizing on her solitude. Other writers, however, have traded on the Boom's success: see for instance Laura Esquivel's pastiche of magical realism in Como agua para chocolate.

The Spanish language author who has had most impact in United States has been Roberto Bolaño. Overall, contemporary literature in the region is vibrant and varied, ranging from the best-selling Paulo Coelho and Isabel Allende to the more avant-garde and critically acclaimed work of writers such as Diamela Eltit, Giannina Braschi, Luisa Valenzuela, Marcos Aguinis, Ricardo Piglia, Roberto Ampuero, Jorge Marchant Lazcano, Alicia Yánez, Jaime Bayly, Alonso Cueto, Edmundo Paz Soldán, Gioconda Belli, Jorge Franco, Daniel Alarcon, Víctor Montoya or Mario Mendoza Zambrano. Other important figures include the Argentine César Aira, the Peruvian-Mexican Mario Bellatin or the Colombian Fernando Vallejo, whose La virgen de los sicarios depicted the violence in Medellín under the influence of the drug trade. Emerging voices include Fernando Ampuero, Miguel Gutierrez, Edgardo Rivera Martinez, Jaime Marchán and Manfredo Kempff.

There has also been considerable attention paid to the genre of testimonio, texts produced in collaboration with subaltern subjects such as Rigoberta Menchú.

Finally, a new breed of chroniclers is represented by the more journalistic Carlos Monsiváis and Pedro Lemebel, who draw also on the long-standing tradition of essayistic production as well as the precedents of engaged and creative non-fiction represented by the Uruguayan Eduardo Galeano and the Mexican Elena Poniatowska, among others.

Prominent 20th century writers

According to literary critic Harold Bloom, the most eminent Latin American author of any century is the Argentine Jorge Luis Borges. In his controversial 1994 book The Western Canon, Bloom says: "Of all Latin American authors in this century, he is the most universal... If you read Borges frequently and closely, you become something of a Borgesian, because to read him is to activate an awareness of literature in which he has gone farther than anybody else."

Among the novelists, perhaps the most prominent author to emerge from Latin America in the 20th century is Gabriel García Márquez. His book Cien Años de Soledad (1967), is one of the most important works in world literature of the 20th century. Borges opined that it was "the Don Quixote of Latin America."

Among the greatest poets of the 20th century is Pablo Neruda; according to Gabriel García Márquez, Neruda "is the greatest poet of the 20th century, in any language."

Mexican writer and poet Octavio Paz is unique among Latin American writers in having won the Nobel Prize, the Neustadt Prize, and the Cervantes Prize. Paz has also been a recipient of the Jerusalem Prize, as well as an honorary doctorate from Harvard.

The most important literary prize of the Spanish language is widely considered to be the Cervantes Prize of Spain. Latin American authors who have won this prestigious award include: José Emilio Pacheco (Mexico), Juan Gelman (Argentina), Nicanor Parra (Chile), Sergio Pitol (Mexico), Gonzalo Rojas (Chile), Álvaro Mutis (Colombia), Jorge Edwards (Chile), Guillermo Cabrera Infante (Cuba), Mario Vargas Llosa (Perú), Dulce María Loynaz (Cuba), Adolfo Bioy Casares (Argentina), Augusto Roa Bastos (Paraguay), Carlos Fuentes (Mexico), Ernesto Sabato (Argentina), Octavio Paz (Mexico), Juan Carlos Onetti (Uruguay), Jorge Luis Borges (Argentina), Alejo Carpentier (Cuba) and Rafael Cadenas (Venezuela).

The Latin American authors who have won the most prestigious literary award in the world, the Nobel Prize for Literature, are: Gabriela Mistral (Chile, 1945), Miguel Ángel Asturias (Guatemala, 1967), Pablo Neruda (Chile, 1971), Gabriel García Márquez (Colombia, 1982), Octavio Paz (Mexico, 1990), and Mario Vargas Llosa (Peru, 2010).

The Neustadt International Prize for Literature, perhaps the most important international literary award after the Nobel Prize, counts several Latin American authors among its recipients; they include: Claribel Alegría (Nicaragua), Álvaro Mutis (Colombia), João Cabral de Melo Neto (Brazil), Octavio Paz (Mexico), and Gabriel García Márquez (Colombia). Candidates for the prize include: Ricardo Piglia (Argentina), Mario Vargas Llosa (Peru), Marjorie Agosin (Chile), Eduardo Galeano (Uruguay), Homero Aridjis (Mexico), Luis Fernando Verissimo (Brazil), Augusto Monterroso (Guatemala), Ernesto Cardenal (Nicaragua), Carlos Fuentes (Mexico), Jorge Luis Borges (Argentina), Jorge Amado (Brazil), Ernesto Sábato (Argentina), Carlos Drummond de Andrade (Brazil), and Pablo Neruda (Chile).

Another important international literary award is the Jerusalem Prize; its recipients include: Marcos Aguinis (Argentina), Mario Vargas Llosa (Peru), Ernesto Sabato (Argentina), Octavio Paz (Mexico), and Jorge Luis Borges (Argentina).

Latin American authors who figured in prominent literary critic Harold Bloom's The Western Canon list of the most enduring works of world literature include: Rubén Dário, Jorge Luis Borges, Alejo Carpentier, Guillermo Cabrera Infante, Severo Sarduy, Reinaldo Arenas, Pablo Neruda, Octavio Paz, César Vallejo, Miguel Ángel Asturias, José Lezama Lima, José Donoso, Julio Cortázar, Gabriel García Márquez, Mario Vargas Llosa, Carlos Fuentes, and Carlos Drummond de Andrade.

Brazilian authors who have won the Camões Prize, the most prestigious literary award in the Portuguese language, include: João Cabral de Melo Neto, Rachel de Queiroz, Jorge Amado, Antonio Candido, Autran Dourado, Rubem Fonseca, Lygia Fagundes Telles, João Ubaldo Ribeiro, and Ferreira Gullar. Some notable authors who have won Brazil's Prêmio Machado de Assis include: Rachel de Queiroz, Cecília Meireles, João Guimarães Rosa, Érico Veríssimo, Lúcio Cardoso, and Ferreira Gullar.

Prominent 21st century writers 

Latin American literature produced since 2000 spans a wide realm of schools and styles. In the 20th Century, Latin American literary studies was primarily centered around what came before, during, and after The Boom. The scholarly optic has since widened to regularly examine Latin American literature within fields such as the Global South, postcolonial literature, postmodern literature, electronic literature, hysterical realism, speculative fiction, Latin American pop culture, crime fiction, horror fiction, among other fields. Prominent 21st authors whose works are widely available, taught, and translated into many languages include Mario Vargas Llosa, Isabel Allende, Jorge Volpi, Junot Diaz, Giannina Braschi, Elena Poniatowska, Julia Alvarez, Diamela Eltit, and Ricardo Piglia.

Latin American Nobel Prize Laureates in Literature

 Gabriela Mistral, Chile (1945)
 Miguel Angel Asturias, Guatemala (1967)
 Pablo Neruda, Chile (1971)
 Gabriel García Márquez, Colombia (1982)
 Octavio Paz, Mexico (1990)
 Mario Vargas Llosa, Peru (2010)

Chronology: Late 19th century-present day

1888	Azul				Rubén Darío			(Nicaragua)
1889     Aves sin nido Clorinda Matto de Turner (Peru)
1899    Dom Casmurro Joaquim Maria Machado de Assis (Brazil)
1900     Ariel José Enrique Rodó (Uruguay)
1900     El Moto                     Joaquin Garcia Monge            (Costa Rica)
1902     Los maitines de la noche    Julio Herrera y Reissig (Uruguay)
1902     Os Sertões Euclides da Cunha (Brazil)
1903     Horas lejanas   Darío Herrera    (Panama)
1915     El hombre de oro Rufino Blanco-Fombona (Venezuela)
1915	Los de abajo			Mariano Azuela	(Mexico)
1917     Los sueños son vida Ricardo Jaimes Freyre (Bolivia)
1919     Irremediablemente Alfonsina Storni (Argentina)
1919     Los frutos ácidos Alfonso Hernández Catá (Cuba)
1919     Raza de bronce Alcides Arguedas (Bolivia)
1922     La amada inmóvil Amado Nervo (Mexico)		
1922	Trilce				César Vallejo		(Peru)
1922	Paulicéia desvairada			Mário de Andrade		(Brazil)
1922	Desolación				Gabriela Mistral		(Chile)
1922     La señorita Etcétera         Arqueles Vela               (Mexico)
1924	La vorágine			José Eustasio Rivera		(Colombia)
1926	Don Segundo Sombra		Ricardo Güiraldes		(Argentina)
1926     La canción de una vida         Fabio Fiallo         (Dominican Republic) 
1928     Macunaíma Mário de Andrade (Brazil)
1928     Poemas en menguante Mariano Brull  (Cuba)
1929	Doña Bárbara			Rómulo Gallegos			(Venezuela)
1929	Los siete locos			Roberto Arlt		(Argentina)
1929     Onda             Rogelio Sinán        (Panama)
1930     O Quinze     Rachel de Queiroz     (Brazil)
1931	Altazor			Vicente Huidobro		(Chile)
1931     Las lanzas coloradas Arturo Uslar Pietri (Venezuela)
1931     Sóngoro Cosongo Nicolás Guillén (Cuba)
1934	Huasipungo			Jorge Icaza 			(Ecuador)
1936     Angústia Graciliano Ramos (Brazil)
1937     Doble acento Eugenio Florit (Cuba)
1938     Olhai os Lírios do Campo Érico Veríssimo (Brazil)
1939     El pozo Juan Carlos Onetti (Uruguay)
1940	La invención de Morel			Adolfo Bioy Casares		(Argentina)
1940	Mamita Yunai			Carlos Luis Fallas		(Costa Rica)
1941     El mundo es ancho y ajeno    Ciro Alegria   (Peru)
1943     Todo verdor perecerá    Eduardo Mallea   (Argentina)
1943     Vestido de Noiva Nelson Rodrigues (Brazil)
1944	Ficciones			Jorge Luis Borges		(Argentina)
1945     A rosa do povo Carlos Drummond de Andrade (Brazil)
1946	El señor presidente			Miguel Ángel Asturias		(Guatemala)
1947     Al filo del agua Agustín Yáñez (Mexico)
1948	El túnel			Ernesto Sabato			(Argentina)
1948	Adán Buenosayres			Leopoldo Marechal		(Argentina)
1949	Hombres de maíz			Miguel Ángel Asturias		(Guatemala)
1949	O tempo e o vento			Érico Veríssimo		(Brazil)
1949	El Aleph			Jorge Luis Borges		(Argentina)
1949	El reino de este mundo			Alejo Carpentier		(Cuba)
1950	Canto general			Pablo Neruda			(Chile)
1950	El laberinto de la soledad	Octavio Paz			(Mexico)
1950	La vida breve	Juan Carlos Onetti			(Uruguay)
1950     Prisión verde Ramón Amaya Amador (Honduras)
1951 La mano junto al muro Guillermo Meneses (Venezuela)
1952     Confabulario Juan José Arreola (Mexico)
1952     La carne de René     Virgilio Piñera     (Cuba)
1953	Los pasos perdidos		Alejo Carpentier		(Cuba)
1955     El negrero Lino Novás Calvo (Cuba)
1955     Morte e Vida Severina João Cabral de Melo Neto (Brazil)
1955	Pedro Páramo			Juan Rulfo			(Mexico)
1956     Grande Sertão: Veredas João Guimarães Rosa (Brazil)
1956	La hora 0			Ernesto Cardenal		(Nicaragua)
1958	Gabriela, cravo e canela			Jorge Amado			(Brazil)
1958     Los ríos profundos José María Arguedas (Peru)
1959     A Morte e a Morte de Quincas Berro d'Água Jorge Amado (Brazil)
1960	Hijo de hombre			Augusto Roa Bastos		(Paraguay)
1960     La tregua Mario Benedetti (Uruguay)
1962	Sobre héroes y tumbas			Ernesto Sabato		(Argentina)
1962	El siglo de las luces			Alejo Carpentier		(Cuba)
1962     La amortajada María Luisa Bombal (Chile)
1962	La muerte de Artemio Cruz			Carlos Fuentes		(Mexico)
1963	Rayuela				Julio Cortázar			(Argentina)
1963	La ciudad y los perros				Mario Vargas Llosa		(Peru)
1964     A Paixão segundo G.H.       Clarice Lispector   (Brazil)
1965     O Vampiro de Curitiba     Dalton Trevisan     (Brazil)
1965 Marzo anterior José Balza (Venezuela)
1966     Cenizas de Izalco Claribel Alegría (El Salvador)
1966     La casa verde Mario Vargas Llosa (Peru)
1966	Paradiso			José Lezama Lima		(Cuba)
1967	Tres tristes tigres		Guillermo Cabrera Infante	(Cuba)
1967	Cien años de soledad		Gabriel García Márquez		(Colombia)
1967     Quarup Antônio Callado (Brazil)
1968     Fuera del juego Heberto Padilla (Cuba)
1969	El mundo alucinante			Reinaldo Arenas		(Cuba)
1970	El obsceno pájaro de la noche	José Donoso	     (Chile)
1970	La cruz invertida	Marcos Aguinis	     (Argentina)
1971     Sargento Getúlio João Ubaldo Ribeiro (Brazil)		
1973     As Meninas      Lygia Fagundes Telles     (Brazil)
1974	Yo, el supremo	Augusto Roa Bastos			(Paraguay)
1974	El limonero real			Juan José Saer		(Argentina)
1975	El otoño del patriarca	Gabriel García Márquez		(Colombia)
1975     Lavoura Arcaica Raduan Nassar (Brazil)
1975     Pobrecito poeta que era yo Roque Dalton (El Salvador)
1975     Poema Sujo Ferreira Gullar (Brazil)
1975	Terra nostra			Carlos Fuentes		(Mexico)
1976	El beso de la mujer araña	Manuel Puig		(Argentina)
1976     La guaracha del Macho Camacho    Luis Rafael Sánchez     (Puerto Rico)    
1978	Maitreya			Severo Sarduy			(Cuba)
1978	Casa de campo			José Donoso		(Chile)
1979     O Que É Isso, Companheiro? Fernando Gabeira (Brazil)
1980	Respiración artificial			Ricardo Piglia		(Argentina)
1981	La guerra del fin del mundo	Mario Vargas Llosa		(Peru)
1982	La casa de los espíritus				Isabel Allende		(Chile)
1985	El amor en los tiempos del cólera	Gabriel García Márquez		(Colombia)
1985	El desfile del amor		Sergio Pitol			(Mexico)
1988	El imperio de los sueños	Giannina Braschi		(Puerto Rico)
1988     O Alquimista Paulo Coelho         (Brazil)
1989	Como agua para chocolate	Laura Esquivel		(Mexico)
1990     Agosto Rubem Fonseca         (Brazil)
1991     La Gesta del Marrano Marcos Aguinis         (Argentina)
1992	Antes que anochezca		Reinaldo Arenas			(Cuba)
1995	Maqroll el gaviero		Álvaro Mutis			(Colombia)
1998	Yo-Yo Boing!		Giannina Braschi			(Puerto Rico)
1998	Los detectives salvajes		Roberto Bolaño			(Chile)
1999	La pasion segun Carmela		Marcos Aguinis			(Argentina)
2000	La fiesta del chivo		Mario Vargas Llosa			(Peru)
2000     Dois irmãos Milton Hatoum         (Brazil)
2001     La reina de América Jorge Majfud         (Uruguay)
2002     Ojos, de otro mirar: poemas Homero Aridjis         (Mexico)
2002	Poesía		Dulce María Loynaz			(Cuba)
2004	2666		Roberto Bolaño			(Chile)
2007     The Brief Wondrous Life of Oscar Wao            Junot Díaz        (Dominican Republic)
2011     United States of Banana     Giannina Braschi    (Puerto Rico)
2019     Torto Arado            Itamar Vieira Junior        (Brazil)

Literature by nationality
Latin American literature written in Spanish and Portuguese by nationality:

 Argentine literature
 Bolivian literature
 Brazilian literature
 Chilean literature
 Colombian literature
 Costa Rican literature
 Cuban literature
 Dominican literature
 Ecuadorian literature
 Guatemalan literature
 Honduran literature
 Mexican literature
 Nicaraguan literature
 Panamanian literature
 Paraguayan literature
 Peruvian literature
 Puerto Rican literature
 Salvadoran literature
 Uruguayan literature
 Venezuelan literature

See also
 List of Latin American writers
 Latin American poetry
 Latino poetry
 Criollismo
 Chicano literature
 Chicano poetry
 Latin American Boom
 McOndo
 Latin American culture
 The Dictator Novel
 Nuyorican
 Hispanic and Latino literature
 Spanish-language literature

References

Further reading

The FSG Book of Twentieth-Century Latin American Poetry: An Anthology / ed. Ilan Stavans, 2011.
The Norton Anthology of Latino Literature / eds. Ilan Stavans, Edna Acosta-Belén, Harold Augenbraum, Gustavo Pérez Firmat, 2010.
Latin American women writers: an encyclopedia / ed. María André; Eva Bueno., 2008
A companion to Latin American literature and culture / ed. Sara Castro-Klarén, 2008
The Cambridge companion to the Latin American novel / ed. Efraín Kristal, 2005
Encyclopedia of Latin American and Caribbean literature, 1900-2003 / ed. Daniel Balderston, 2004
Literary cultures of Latin America : a comparative history / ed. Mario J. Valdés, 2004
Latin American writers at work (Interviews) / ed. George Plimpton, 2003
Literatures of Latin America: from Antiquity to the Present / Willis Barnstone, 2003
Cuerpos errantes: literatura latina y latinoamericana en Estados Unidos/ Laura Rosa Loustau, 2002.
Latin American writers. Supplement I / ed. Carlos A Solé;  Klaus Müller-Bergh., 2002
Concise encyclopedia of Latin American literature / ed. Verity Smith, 2000
Latin American literature and its times (12 volumes) / Joyce Moss, 1999
Mutual impressions : writers from the Americas reading one another / ed. Ilan Stavans, 1999
Encyclopedia of Latin American literature / ed. Verity Smith, 1997
From romanticism to modernismo in Latin America / ed. David William Foster, 1997
The Cambridge History of Latin American literature / ed. Roberto González Echevarría, 1996
Modern Latin-American fiction writers / ed. William Luis, 1994
Handbook of Latin American literature / ed. David William Foster, 1992
Feminist readings on Spanish and Latin-American literature / ed. Lisa P Condé, 1991
Past, present, and future : selected studies on Latin American Indian literatures / ed. Mary M. Preuss, 1991
The Polemics of Possession in Spanish American Narrative / Rolena Adorno
Magical realism and beyond : the contemporary Spanish and Latin American novel / ed. Roy C Boland, 1991
Modern Latin American fiction (The Critical Cosmos Series) / ed. Harold Bloom, 1990
Latin American writers (3 Volumes) / ed. Carlos A Solé, 1989
Philosophy and literature in Latin America : a critical assessment of the current situation / ed. Jorge Gracia, 1989
Latin American literature in the 20th century : a guide / ed. Leonard S Klein, 1988
Modern Latin American fiction : a survey / ed. John King, 1987
In retrospect : essays on Latin American literature / ed. Elizabeth S Rogers, 1987
Latin America in its literature / ed. César Fernández Moreno, 1980
Latin American fiction today : a symposium / ed. Rose S Minc, 1979
Tradition and renewal : essays on twentieth-century Latin American literature and culture / ed. Merlin H Forster, 1975
Modern Latin American literature (A Library of Literary Criticism) / David William Foster, 1975
Modern Latin American literature / David Patrick Gallagher, 1973
Contemporary Latin American literature; a conference / ed. Harvey Leroy Johnson, 1973
Scholarly books and papers about 20th century Latin American writers published by Rhina Toruño Haensly.

External links
 Literature from Latin America, from LANIC
 Palabra virtual Latin American Poetry.
 miniTEXTOS.org Contemporary short-stories, poetry, essays and theatre.
 Latineos Latin America, Caribbean, arts and culture

 
Literature
Caribbean literature
Central American literature
North American literature
South American literature